The Huron National Forest is a National Forest in the Lower Peninsula of Michigan. It was established in 1909 after the logging era began to decline. In 1945, it was administratively combined with the Manistee National Forest, to create the Huron-Manistee National Forest. However, these are not connected and are separate forests.  It provides recreation opportunities for visitors, habitat for fish and wildlife, and resources for local industry. The headquarters for the forest is located in Cadillac, Michigan.

History
During the Great Depression land was bought by the U.S. Forest Service to help farmers and landowners and to inject money into the economy. However, some landowners only sold the unproductive land and kept the productive areas, thus breaking up the land purchases. The Forest Service established the Huron National Forest in 1909.

The Huron National Forest is 437,287 acres spreading 70 miles east to west and 30 miles north to south. The forest was renamed in 1929 after an Iroquoian tribe of the Great Lakes Region—the Huron.

Geography

The Huron National Forest is prone to frequent seasonal forest fires, due to ecological and geological factors including the domination of the jack pine in sections the forests, the needles of which are extremely flammable, sandy soil composition as a result of glacial outwash plain geology of sections of the Huron National Forest, and jack pine barrens management practices to create nesting habitat for the Kirtland's warbler resulting in dense, young stands of jack pine that are extremely susceptible to crowning wildfires.

The fire destroyed 13 homes, damaged two others, and destroyed or damaged 46 outbuildings.

Features

The Bull Gap ORV Trail is located in the Huron National Forest. It contains  of off-road vehicle trails.

The threatened Kirtland's warbler nests in the area, and tours are available, subject to time restrictions.

See also

References

External links

 
National Forests of Michigan
1909 establishments in Michigan
Important Bird Areas of Michigan
Northern Michigan
Protected areas of Oceana County, Michigan
Protected areas of Muskegon County, Michigan
Protected areas of Mecosta County, Michigan
Protected areas of Montcalm County, Michigan
Protected areas of Oscoda County, Michigan
Protected areas of Alcona County, Michigan
Protected areas of Iosco County, Michigan
Protected areas of Crawford County, Michigan
Protected areas of Ogemaw County, Michigan
Landmarks in Michigan